The Batangas International Port or locally known as the Batangas Pier, is a seaport in Barangay Santa Clara, Batangas City primarily serving the Calabarzon region of the Philippines. The seaport covers an area of about 150 hectares.

It was declared as a national port in 1956. It serves as an alternate port to the Port of Manila. In the 90's it was the second biggest port in the Philippines in terms of revenue, just behind the Port of Manila.

Terminals

Cargo terminal 
The Batangas Container Terminal (BCT) of the Batangas International Port is operated by listed Asian Terminals Inc. is a major trading port outside Metro Manila serving major industries in Southern Luzon. BCT handled over 85,000 twenty-foot equivalent units (TEUs) of international containers from January to July 2016. In 2015 the terminal handled 130,000 TEUs in 2015, 28.9% of its actual capacity of 450,000 TEUs.

The Port of Batangas in 2014 was only handling 12,000 TEUs or 2.7% of its actual capacity. Philippine Ports Authority (PPA) discounts in the port and docking fees at the Batangas Port attracted more foreign and local shipping firms and incentivized them for helping decongest Manila's facilities. In 2016 it was reported that the Japan International Cooperation Agency (JICA) has proposed to transfer operations of the Port of Manila to the Batangas International Port, citing the fact that most of the domestic shipping largely comes from South of Manila, saying that ship operating costs would be relatively lower if vessels were docked in Batangas City rather than in Manila.

Other competing ports such as the Port of Subic Bay are also providing container storage services to ease congestion at the Manila ports. In August 2014, PPA reported an 85%–89% yard utilization for the MICT and Manila South Harbor.

Passenger terminal
The Batangas port is also a gateway for passengers, Roro/ferry (terminal 2) and tourist traffic. There are 3 passenger terminals located inside the port, after the toll entrance. The presence of a population of hustlers, tourist guides, and pushy unofficial port authority "helpers" targeting tourists can be a problem especially for foreign visitors who are not familiar with the organization of the terminal. The boats have tendency not to leave on time, and the poor reputation of the passenger terminal is in serious need of improvement. Some Roro ferry services also seem to consistently fail meeting maritime safety standards due to minimum ship maintenance, and chronic overload.

On passenger terminal 3, ferry tickets for Puerto Galera, a popular tourist destination, can be purchased directly on arrival next to the piers to Sabang, Whitebeach, Muelle and Balatero. This city is situated approximately 01:15-hour away from Batangas port on the north tip of Mindoro island across the Verde island passage from Luzon (the main island where Manila is situated). Before boarding, passengers also need to a pay in cash a variety of local taxes such as an environmental user fee and terminal fee. Puerto Galera is accessible through regular ferry lines operating 60 to 120 passenger outrigger ferries i.e. traditional big "bangka", including FSL or Father and Son Shipping Lines and MSL, Minolo Shipping Lines, Challenge and Passion Shipping Lines.

Other passenger regular lines include access by ferry to :
 the Sibuyan Island (Romblon province) from Batangas to the port of Romblon and then Cajidiocan, or with a transfer in Romblon to Azagra, Magdiwang/Ambulong. The journey from Batangas to Romblon needs the whole night.
 Calapan (Oriental Mindoro province) by fast catamaran Roll-on/Roll-off (RoRo) ferries. The route is very much saturated.
Abra de Ilog (Occidental Mindoro province) by regular RoRo.
 Caticlan (Boracay) in Aklan by fast catamaran Roll-on/Roll-off (RoRo) ferries.

Administration
The Batangas port is under the management of Philippine Ports Authority (PPA), the port administration in the Philippines, created in 1975 and attached to what is now the Department of Transportation (DOTr) for policy and program coordination. Port administration was merged with the traditional function of revenue collection of the Bureau of Customs (BOC). PPA is also vested with the function of undertaking all port construction projects under its port system.

The port falls within the administrative jurisdiction of the Customs Collection District of Batangas or Collection District IV, an area defined by the BOC which comprises the province of Aurora, Batangas, Quezon, Marinduque, Oriental and Occidental Mindoro, Palawan. Batangas City which hosts the port is defined by the customs as the district's principal port of entry while the sub-ports of entry are designated as Puerto Princesa in Palawan and Plaridel, Quezon and Aurora.

Expansion and development issues 
In March 2016, Operator Asian Terminals Inc. announce plans to invest  primarily to improve port operations in the Batangas port, as well as the Port of Manila. The plan involves increasing the capacity of the port which is projected to accommodate more domestic passengers and international container cargoes.

The port of Batangas can improve its attractiveness in providing competitively-priced electricity or energy to investors and in offering higher quality maritime services. Regulations and ease-of-doing-business policies and standard operating procedures can be improved significantly.

The size of interior roads connecting the port leads to congestion that renders highways and expressways far less effective. The idea that the connection of the port to the Southern Tagalog Arterial Road (STAR Tollway) and South Luzon Expressway (SLEx) without passing through the Batangas City proper would be needed to materialize; it was since completed when STAR Tollway is now connected with SLEX since December 2010. In addition, the construction of a railway system connecting the Port of Batangas to metro Manila would certainly accelerate its development.

These topics are regularly debated at the provincial level in particular during the Batangas governor election.

See also
List of East Asian ports

References

Ports and harbors of the Philippines
Buildings and structures in Batangas City
Transportation in Batangas